The ranks and insignia of the National Socialist Motor Corps (Nationalsozialistisches Kraftfahrkorps, abbr. NSKK) were a paramilitary rank system in Germany used between the years of 1931 and 1945. They were based closely on the ranks and insignia of the Sturmabteilung (SA), of which the NSKK was originally a part.

Rank Insignia

Unit Insignia
For all ranks Oberstaffelführer and below, the NSKK displayed a unit collar patch, worn on the right collar, opposite the badge of rank.  This unit badge displayed a member's Sturm (Company) number, followed by the number of the motorized regiment to which they belonged within the National Socialist Motor Corps.

See also
 Comparative ranks of Nazi Germany

References

pl:Narodowo-Socjalistyczny Korpus Motorowy#Stopnie